A total lunar eclipse will take place on May 6, 2050.

This lunar eclipse will be the first of a tetrad, four total lunar eclipses in series. The previous series will have taken place in 2043 and 2044, starting with the March 2043 lunar eclipse.

This will be the 58th member of Lunar Saros 122. The previous event will have been the April 2032 lunar eclipse.

Visibility

Related lunar eclipses

Lunar year series

Metonic series

Tzolkinex 
 Preceded: Lunar eclipse of March 25, 2036

 Followed: Lunar eclipse of June 17, 2057

See also
List of lunar eclipses and List of 21st-century lunar eclipses
Tetrad

Notes

External links

2050-05
2050-05
2050 in science